Jim Stanford is a Canadian economist and founder of the Progressive Economics Forum. He holds a master's degree in economics from Cambridge University and a doctorate from the New School for Social Research. He is author of a column for the Canadian newspaper The Globe and Mail. In 2016 Stanford relocated to Australia, where he is the founding director of the Centre for the Future of Work, a left wing research organisation funded by the public policy think tank, The Australia Institute. He is also a regular contributor on economics to Huffington Post Australia.

Published works

Books
 Economics for Everyone: A Short Guide to the Economics of Capitalism (with Tony Biddle) London ; Ann Arbor, MI : Pluto Press, 2008.
 Challenging The Market: The Struggle To Regulate Work And Income (with Leah F. Vosko  and the  Challenging the Market Conference), 2004
 Paper Boom: Why Real Prosperity Requires a New Approach to Canada's Economy, Lorimer, 1999
 Power, Employment, and Accumulation: Social Structures in Economic Theory and Policy (with Lance Taylor  and Ellen Houston) Armonk, N.Y. : M.E. Sharpe 2000  
 Estimating the effects of North American Free Trade: A three-country general equilibrium model with "real- world" assumptions, 1993
 Social dumping under North American free trade, 1993.
 Going south: Cheap labour as an unfair subsidy in North American free trade, 1991

Peer-reviewed articles

Other publications
 Sharing the Work, Sparing the Planet: Work Time, Consumption, and Ecology. (book review): in  Labour/Le Travail  (Digital – Jul 28, 2005)
 Gomery, upside down.(CANADA): in Catholic New Times   (Digital – Jul 25, 2005)
 Janis Sarra, ed., Corporate Governance in Global Capital Markets.(Book Review): in Labour/Le Travail  (Digital – Jan 25, 2006)
 Introduction.(Forum on Labour and the Economic Crisis: Can the Union Movement Rise to the Occasion?)(Essay):in Labour/Le Travail by Jim Stanford  (Digital – Jan 26, 2010)
 Challenging the Market the Struggle To Regulate Work and Income   (1980)

References

External links 

Canadian economists
Living people
The New School alumni
Alumni of the University of Cambridge
The Globe and Mail columnists
Year of birth missing (living people)